Rosaspata may refer to:

 Rosaspata District
 Vitcos, the Inca city now called the ruins of Rosaspata.